Glace Bay may refer to:

 Glace Bay, a town on Cape Breton, Nova Scotia, Canada
 Baie de Glace, the harbour at Glace Bay, Cape Breton, Nova Scotia, Canada
 , several ships of the Royal Canadian Navy
 Glace Bay-Dominion, formerly "Glace Bay", a provincial electoral district of Nova Scotia, Canada, on Cape Breton Island
 Glace Bay High School, Glace Bay, Cape Breton, Nova Scotia, Canada

See also

 Big Glace Bay, Cape Breton, Nova Scotia, Canada
 

Disambiguation pages